Abitibi-Est is a provincial electoral district in the Abitibi-Témiscamingue region of Quebec, Canada, that elects members to the National Assembly of Quebec.  The district notably includes eastern portions of the city of Rouyn-Noranda as well as Val-d'Or, Malartic and Senneterre.

The riding was created for the 1944 election from a part of Abitibi.

In the change from the 2001 to the 2011 electoral map, Abitibi-Est lost the municipality of Barraute and its share of the unorganized territory of Lac-Despinassy to Abitibi-Ouest.

Members of the Legislative Assembly / National Assembly

Election results

|-
 
|Liberal
|Guy Bourgeois
|align="right"| 8,476
|align="right"| 41.09
|align="right"| +6.24

|-

|}

|-
 
|Liberal
|Pierre Corbeil
|align="right"| 7,653
|align="right"| 34.85
|align="right"| -11.18

  
|-

|}

^ Change is from redistributed results. CAQ change is from ADQ.

References

External links
Information
 Elections Quebec

Election results
 Election results (National Assembly)

Maps
 2011 map (PDF)
 2001 map (Flash)
2001–2011 changes (Flash)
1992–2001 changes (Flash)
 Electoral map of Abitibi-Témiscamingue region
 Quebec electoral map, 2011

Neighbouring districts

Quebec provincial electoral districts
Rouyn-Noranda
Val-d'Or